The 2022 Grand Prix of Spain is a wrestling event was held in Madrid, Spain between 8 and 10 July 2022.

Medal table

Team ranking

Medal overview

Men's freestyle

Men's Greco-Roman

Women's freestyle

Participating nations 
207 wrestlers from 24 countries:

  (6)
  (6)
  (28)
  (38) (Host)
  (4)
  (7)
  (14)
  (10)
  (16)
  (3)
  (7)
  (3)
  (1)
  (2)
  (1)
  (27)
  (1)
  (1)
  (3)
  (5)
  (3)
  (3)
  (22)
 UWW Refugee Team (1)

References

External links 
 UWW Database

Grand Prix of Spain
International wrestling competitions hosted by Spain
Sport in Madrid
Wrestling in Spain
Grand Prix of Spain